Cylindromorphoides is a genus of beetles in the family Buprestidae, containing the following species:

 Cylindromorphoides agriliformes (Kerremans, 1897)
 Cylindromorphoides katrinae Hornburg, 2003

References

Buprestidae genera